Hengelo Gezondheidspark is a railway station in Hengelo, The Netherlands.

History
The station is located on the Staatslijn D (Zutphen - Glanerbeek) and is located near the Streekziekenhuis Midden-Twente (Hospital) in the west of Hengelo. A station called Tuindorp-Nijverheid, which opened on 1 November 1865 as part of the Staatslijn D and closed in 1936, used to exist in the general area of the new station. The construction of the new station was planned to begin by April 2009, and to be completed by December 2009. The station finally opened on 9 December 2012. The train services are operated by Syntus.

Train services

Bus services

External links
NS website 
Dutch Public Transport journey planner 

Railway stations in Overijssel
Railway stations on the Staatslijn D
Hengelo